Tani Barlow is a scholar of feminism, postcoloniality, and history in Asia and most specifically in China. She is the George and Nancy Rupp Professor of Humanities at Rice University. Formerly, Barlow was a professor of history and women studies at the University of Washington. She is known for her research on Chinese feminism.

Education
1985 Ph.D. History, University of California, Davis,
1979 M.A. History, University of California, Davis
1975 B.A. History and Chinese language dual degree, San Francisco State University

Career
Shanghai Teachers University, lecturer in American culture, 1981–82; University of Missouri-Columbia, assistant professor of history, 1985–90, associate professor of history, 1990–92; San Francisco State University, associate professor, 1992–94; University of Washington, Women Studies, associate professor, 1994–97, professor, 1997-2008, professor of history, 2004–08; Rice University, professor of history, Ting Tsung and Wei Fong Chao Professor of Asian Studies,  Chao Center for Asian Studies, director, 2008-2019. George and Nancy Rupp Professor of Humanities,

Awards
Barlow edits the journal positions: east asia cultures critique,  for which she received the 1995 Best New Journal Award, the 2009 Best Special Issue Award and the 2011 Best Special Issue Award from The Council of Editors of Learned Journals of the Modern Language Association.

Publications
Tani Barlow, Madeleine Dong, Uta Poiger, Priti Ramamurthy, Lynn Thomas, and Alys Weinbaum (eds.) The Modern Girl Around the World,  Durham: Duke University Press, 2008
Tani Barlow, The Question of Women in Chinese Feminism, Durham: Duke University Press, 2004
Tani Barlow (ed.) New Asian Marxisms, Durham: Duke University Press, 1997
Tani Barlow (ed.), Formations of Colonial Modernity in East Asia, Durham: Duke University Press, 1997
Tani Barlow (ed.), Gender Politics in Modern China: Writing and Feminism, Durham: Duke University Press, 1994
Tani Barlow and Angela Zito, Body, Subject, and Power in China, Chicago: University of Chicago Press, 1994

Video

A lecture at Duke University

Notes

External links
 Rice University, Department of History website - Includes Barlow's Curriculum Vitae, Courses, and Selected Papers.
 Google scholar profile
 Tani Barlow Papers - Pembroke Center Archives, Brown University

Rice University faculty
University of Washington faculty
University of California, Davis alumni
San Francisco State University alumni
Living people
Year of birth missing (living people)
Gender studies academics
American women historians
21st-century American historians
21st-century American women